The 2009 Canada Summer Games were held in Charlottetown, Prince Edward Island from August 15 to 29.

Medal standings
The following is the medal table for the 2009 Canada Summer Games.

Events

Athletics
Baseball
Basketball
Canoe/Kayak
Cycling
Diving
Golf
Rowing
Rugby
Sailing
Soccer
Softball
Swimming
Tennis
Triathlon
Beach volleyball
Volleyball
Wrestling

Yukon won its first Canada summer games gold medal at these games courtesy of Alexendra Gabor in the 400M freestyle event in swimming 
She also won all of Yukon's medals.

Venues
Alberton Memorial Field, Alberton - Softball
Brookvale Winter Activity Park, Brookvale - Cycling
Brudnell River Golf Course, Roseneath - Golf 
CARI Aquatics Facility, Charlottetown - Swimming, Diving
Centennial Pool, Halifax - Diving
Chi-Wan Young Sports Centre, Charlottetown - Volleyball
Clipper Field, Cardigan - Baseball 
Credit Union Place, Summerside - Opening Ceremony 
Eastern Eagles Soccer Complex, Lower Montague - Soccer
École Évangeline Softball Field, Abrams Village - Softball
Evangeline Region - Cycling
Jerry McCormack Memorial Complex, Souris - Soccer
Kensington Intermediate Senior High School, Kensington - Soccer
Lions Club Field, Kensington - Softball
MacLauchlan Arena, Charlottetown - Volleyball
MacNeil Memorial Field, Stratford - Baseball
Memorial Field, Charlottetown - Baseball
Montague and Area Recreation Facility, Montague - Wrestling
Morell Soccer Complex, Morell - Soccer
O'Leary Softball Field, O'Leary - Softball
Silver Fox Curling & Yacht Club, Summerside - Sailing
Southwest River - Canoe/Kayak, Rowing
Stratford Soccer Field, Stratford - Soccer
Summerside Waterfront, Summerside - Triathlon, Cycling
Summerside Wellness Centre, Summerside - Basketball, Soccer, Beach Volleyball
Three Oaks Senior High School, Summerside - Rugby, Basketball
UPEI Alumni Canada Games Place, Charlottetown - Athletics, Soccer, Closing Ceremonies
Victoria Park Tennis Courts, Charlottetown - Tennis
VIV FIeld, Summerside - Softball
Westisle Composite High School, Elmsdale - Soccer

Official site
Jeux du Canada 2009

References

External links

 
2009 Canada Games
Canada Games, 2009
Canada Games, 2009